Chantal Rouleau  is a Canadian politician, who was elected to the National Assembly of Quebec in the 2018 provincial election. She represents the electoral district of Pointe-aux-Trembles as a member of the Coalition Avenir Québec.

Prior to her election to the legislature, Rouleau served on Montreal City Council. She became mayor of the borough of Rivière-des-Prairies–Pointe-aux-Trembles in June 2010 following a municipal by-election. She was a member of the Vision Montréal municipal political party until May 30, 2013, when she left to join Équipe Denis Coderre.

Rouleau had previously been involved in sustainable development initiatives in Montreal's east end for more than 30 years.

Cabinet posts

References

External links
Chantal Rouleau (Vision Montreal)
Arrondissement Rivière-des-Prairies–Pointe-aux-Trembles - Chantal Rouleau

Montreal city councillors
Living people
Mayors of places in Quebec
Members of the Executive Council of Quebec
Women mayors of places in Quebec
Rivière-des-Prairies–Pointe-aux-Trembles
21st-century Canadian politicians
21st-century Canadian women politicians
Women government ministers of Canada
Women municipal councillors in Canada
Coalition Avenir Québec MNAs
Women MNAs in Quebec
1959 births